DR Byen (literally: "the DR City") is the headquarters of the Danish Broadcasting Corporation, DR, located in Copenhagen, Denmark.

DR moved all employees from Radiohuset in Frederiksberg and TV-Byen in Søborg to DR Byen during 2006 and 2007.

Facilities
DR Byen consists of four segments:
 Segment 1: Houses all facilities related to DR's TV productions.
 Segment 2: Houses DR's news, sport and weather departments.
 Segment 3: Houses P4 Copenhagen and administration.
 Segment 4: Houses DR Koncerthuset (Previously Copenhagen Concert Hall in English)

The DR Byen Station on the M1 line of Copenhagen Metro is located nearby.

Gallery

References 

Radio in Denmark
Television in Denmark
Buildings and structures in Copenhagen
Mass media in Copenhagen
DR (broadcaster)
Television studios